Lactarius cistophilus is a species of fungus of the milk-cap genus Lactarius in the order Russulales. Found in Mediterranean Europe, it was described as new to science in 1978.

See also
List of Lactarius species

References

External links

cistophilus
Fungi described in 1978
Fungi of Europe